Kola Oyewo (born 27 March 1946) is a Nigerian veteran actor, dramatist, and scholar.

Early life
He was born on 27 March 1946 at Oba Ile, a town in Osun State, South West (Nigeria).

Education
He attended Obafemi Awolowo University where he obtained a certificate in dramatic arts, and a certificate in Yoruba oral literature before he later received a Bachelor of Arts (B.A.) degree in Theatre art from the same university in 1995. 
He proceeded to the University of Ibadan where he received a Master of Arts (M.A.) and doctorate degree (Ph.D.) in drama.

Career
He began acting as a professional in 1964 after he joined the "Oyin Adejobi theatre group" and the first role he played was Adejare in Orogun Adedigba, which was Oyin Adejobi's autobiography.
After he spent nine years with Oyin Adejobi, he joined the University of Ife theatre, where he worked with the late veteran dramatist and scholar, chief Ola Rotimi. 
Kola Oyewo was known for the role he played as "Odewale" in The Gods Are Not To Blame, a drama by Ola Rotimi.

In 1996, Oyewo joined the services of Obafemi Awolowo University, where he rose to the rank of senior lecturer before retiring in September 2011. After his retirement from Obafemi Awolowo University, he joined the services of Redeemer's University, where he currently serves as head of the department of dramatic art. He is currently working at Elizade University Ilara-Mokin, Ondo State as a performing arts lecturer.

Filmography
Sango (1997)
Super Story (episode 1)
The Gods Are Not To Blame
Saworoide
Koseegbe (1995)

References

Living people
Nigerian male film actors
Yoruba male actors
People from Osun State
Male actors from Osun State
1946 births
Obafemi Awolowo University alumni
University of Ibadan alumni
Male actors in Yoruba cinema
20th-century Nigerian male actors
21st-century Nigerian male actors
Academic staff of Obafemi Awolowo University
Yoruba academics
Academic staff of Redeemer's University Nigeria
Nigerian male television actors
Nigerian dramatists and playwrights
20th-century dramatists and playwrights